Calistoga may refer to:

 Calistoga, California
 Calistoga AVA, an American Viticultural Area that partly overlaps the town of Calistoga
 Calistoga Water Company, bottled water brand sourced in Calistoga, California 
 Calistoga, code name for Intel's 945 chipset designed for use in mobile devices
 Calistoga, a Post-hardcore band from Brazil
 "Calistoga", a song by God Is an Astronaut from the album Origins